The first evidence of Maldivian literature is known as Lōmāfānu (copper-plate grants) from the 12th century. Lōmāfānu is in the oldest known written form of Maldivian.

Starting of modern era
Husain Salaahuddheen wrote Siyarathunnabaviyyaa . The poet Addu Bandeyri Hasan Manikufaan ranks as the most important major littérateur in the Maldivian language. Addu Bandeyri Hasan Manikufaan wrote Dhiyoage Raivaru. Other poets include Assayyidhu Bodufenvalhugey Seedhee (Bodufenvalhuge Sidi).

Maldivian authors 
H. Salahuddin
Bodufenvalhuge Sidi
Saikuraa Ibrahim Naeem
Ibrahim Shihab
Mohamed Amin Didi

 
Maldivian language